Pagon is the highest mountain in Brunei. It is situated on the border with Malaysia on the island of Borneo. Pagon Hill is located in the Temburong District of Brunei. This district is separated from the rest of Brunei by part of the Sarawak State of Malaysia.

The pitcher plant species Nepenthes lowii can be found on the slopes of this mountain.

See also 
 List of elevation extremes by country

References

External links
 

Mountains of Brunei
Bukit Pagon
International mountains of Asia
Brunei–Malaysia border
Temburong District
Highest points of countries